Kudumbavilakku is an Indian Malayalam-language television soap opera drama. The show premieres on Asianet channel and has streamed on Disney+ Hotstar since 27 January 2020. Meera Vasudevan portrays the lead role in the series, returning to television after thirteen years.

The series is produced by Chitra Shenoy under Good Company Productions, is an official remake of Bengali TV series Sreemoyee which depicts the story of a hardworking housewife Sumithra (played by Meera Vasudevan), who is not acknowledged or appreciated for her work. Then she decides to rediscover herself and prove her worth.

Plot 
The show revolves around a Malayalee homemaker, Sumithra Menon and her family. Sumithra, a devoted housewife, mother and daughter-in-law, is family-oriented and self-sacrificing. Sumithra is married to Siddharth Menon and has three children; Anirudh Menon, a doctor, Pratheesh Menon, an aspiring musician, and Sheetal Menon, a college student. They live with Siddharth's parents, Shivadas and Saraswati. Except for Shivadas, Pratheesh, Sreekumar and their servant Mallika, no one cares for Sumitra's happiness or feelings. In addition to this misery, Siddharth divorces her and marries Vedhika. Initially devastated, she realises her worth and attempts to rediscover herself. How she transforms into a head-strong woman and gains the love of her family forms the crux of this soap-opera. She starts her business "Sumithra's" which makes her a business magnate. Later, an unexpected twist arrives in the story, Sumithra - Rohith marriage. Breaking typical, cliché, toxic notions of daily soaps. By Portrayal of Healthy re marriage, Kudumbavilakku creates a revolution.

Cast

Main
 Meera Vasudevan as Sumithra (formerly Menon) – Savithriyamma's daughter; Deepu's sister; Sidharth's ex-wife; Anirudh, Pratheesh and Sheethal's mother; Rohit's wife. 
 Krishnakumar Menon as Sidharth "Sidhu" Menon – Shivdas and Saraswathiyamma's son; Sumithra's ex-husband; Vedika's second husband; Anirudh, Pratheesh and Sheethal's father; Sharanya's brother 
 Shwetha Venkat / Ameya Nair / Saranya Anand as Vedika Menon – Vasumatiyamma's daughter; Sampath's ex-wife; Sidharth's second wife; Neerav's mother

Recurring

The Sreenilayam family
 F. J. Tharakan as Shivadas Menon – Saraswathi's husband; Sidharth and Sharanya's father; Anirudh, Pratheesh and Sheetal's grandfather; Sreekumar and Vedhika's father-in-law; Sumithra's ex-father-in-law.
 Devi Menon as Saraswathi Menon aka Saraswathiyamma – Shivdas's wife; Sidharth and Sharanya's mother; Anirudh, Pratheesh and Sheetal's grandmother; Sreekumar and Vedhika's mother-in-law; Sumithra's ex-mother-in-law. 
 Sreejith Vijay / Anand Narayan as Dr. Anirudh Menon – Sumithra and Sidharth's elder son; Pratheesh and Sheetal's brother; Ananya's husband; Pooja's stepbrother ; Rohit's stepson.
 Akshaya R. Nair / Athira Madhav / Aswathy Ash as Dr. Ananya Menon – Prema's daughter; Anirudh's wife; Sumithra and Sidharth's daughter-in-law; Pratheesh,Pooja and Sheetal's sister-in-law.
 Noobin Johny as Pratheesh Menon – Sumithra and Sidharth's younger son; Anirudh and Sheetal's brother; Sanjana's husband; Pooja's stepbrother ; Rohit's stepson.
 Reshma Nandu as Sanjana Menon – Ramakrishnan's daughter; Maneesh's widow; Pratheesh's wife; Sumithra and Sidharth's daughter-in-law; Anirudh,Pooja and Sheetal's sister-in-law.
 Parvathi Vijay / Amritha Nair / Sreelakshmi Sreekumar  as Sheetal Menon – Sumithra and Sidharth's daughter; Anirudh and Pratheesh's sister; Pooja's stepsister; Rohit's stepdaughter.
 Manoj Nair / Sumesh Surendran as Sreekumar – Sharanya's husband; Nileena's former love interest
 Sindhu Varma / Manju Satheesh as Saranya Menon Sreekumar – Shivadas and Saraswathiyamma's daughter; Sidharth's sister; Sreemukar's wife; Anirudh, Pratheesh and Sheetal's aunt; Sumithra's ex-sister-in-law; Vedhika's sister-in-law.
 Manju Vijeesh as Mallika – Sreenilayam family's domestic help

Others
 Dr. Shaju Shaam as Rohith Gopal – Sumithra's classmate and husband; Pooja's father; 

 Padmakumar as CI Narayanan Kutty – Circle Inspector of Police
 Gouri Prakash/ Aiswarya Unni as Pooja Gopal – Rohit's daughter; Sheetal's friend
 Bindhu Pankaj as Nileena Bhaskar – Sumithra's best friend since college; Shreekumar's former love interest
 Jithu Venugopal as Anoop, a goon who works for Mahendran
 Fawaz Zayani as Sampath – Vedhika's ex-husband; Neerav's father
 Shahnu / Amrutha S Ganesh as Dr. Indraja - Anirudh's superior
 Hari as Deepankuran aka Deepu – Savithri's son; Sumithra's brother; Chithra's husband; Jishnu's father
 Sunitha as Savithri aka Savithriyamma – Sumithra and Deepu's mother; Anirudh, Pratheesh, Sheethal and Jishnu's grandmother; Rohit's mother-in-law; Sidharth's ex-mother-in-law.
 Parvathy Raveendran as Chitra – Deepu's wife; Jishnu's mother
 Krishna as Premajam – Ananya's mother
 Firosh Mohan as Naveen – Vedika's friend
 K. P. A. C. Saji / Amboori Jayan as Ramakrishnan – Sanjana's father
Devi Chandana as Susheela - Ramakrishnan's second wife 
 Hari as Vivek - Rohith's friend
 Akhil as Jishnu – Deepu and Chithra's son; Anirudh, Pratheesh and Sheethal's cousin
 Swathi Thara as DCP Chandralekha – IPS officer
 Renjusha Menon as SI Nirmala
 Sruthisha Nair as Shilpa – Member of Pratheesh's band who loves him
 Sreerang Shine as Neerav – Sampath and Vedika's son
 Geetha Nair as Vasumati aka Vasumatiyamma – Vedika's mother
 Shobi Thilakan as Adv. Vasudevan – Sumithra and Siddharth's divorce lawyer
 Sarath Sreehari as Pianist – Pratheesh's bandmate
 Divya Sreedhar as Preetha's mother
 Saju Kodiyan as Rev. Francis Mupliyanthadathil – Sheethal's school principal
 Vanchiyoor Praveen Kumar as Udayabhanu – Shivadas's colleague who works at a resort
 Jeevan Gopal as Jithin Raj – A fraudster and drug addict who wants to marry Sheetal
 Alif Muhammed as Maneesh – Sanjana's first husband (dead)
 Sheelasree as Maneesh's mother
Joe Varghese as Sajin – Sheetal's boyfriend

Guest appearances
 Innocent as the chief guest at the Mother's Day Competition at Sheetal's school (episodes 5 and 6)
 Aju Varghese as himself, for the inauguration of Sumithra's shop (Episode 205)

Reception

Kudumbavilakku had a TRP rating of 6.1 million in late March 2020.

References

External links
 Kudumbavilakku on Hotstar

Asianet (TV channel) original programming
2020 Indian television series debuts
Malayalam-language television shows
Indian drama television series
Indian television series
Indian television soap operas
Serial drama television series